Oil fields claimed by ISIL in the alleged controlled regions are listed on this page (as of March 2015):

See also 

Oil production in ISIL

References 

ISIL claimed
Islamic State of Iraq and the Levant in Libya
Libya, ISIL claimed